Love or Justice is a 1917 American silent crime drama film directed by Walter Edwards and starring Louise Glaum, Charles Gunn and Jack Richardson.

Cast
 Louise Glaum as Nan Bishop
 Charles Gunn as Jack Dunn
 Jack Richardson as Paul Keeley
 J. Barney Sherry as Winthrop E. Haines
 Dorcas Matthews as Phyllis Geary
 Charles K. French as Judge Geary
 Louis Durham as Lieutenant Dillon

References

Bibliography
 Langman, Larry. American Film Cycles: The Silent Era. Greenwood Publishing, 1998.

External links
 

1917 films
1917 drama films
1910s English-language films
American silent feature films
Silent American drama films
American black-and-white films
Triangle Film Corporation films
Films directed by Walter Edwards
1910s American films